Hard Times Come Easy is a song by American rock singer/guitarist Richie Sambora, released as the first single from his second solo album Undiscovered Soul in 1998. The song charted at #39 on the Mainstream rock chart and #37 in the UK. The single featured a music video.

Track listing 
 "Hard Times Come Easy' - 4:33	
 "Midnight Rider / Wanted Dead or Alive (Live)" - 7:54	
 "We All Sleep Alone (Live)" - 5:00	
 "Bad Medicine (Live)" - 5:06	

Live tracks recorded live at Spreckles Theatre, San Diego.

Charts

References

1998 singles
Songs written by Richie Sambora
1998 songs
Mercury Records singles
Richie Sambora songs